The Fairfield Inn was an historic hotel building located on Fairfield Lake near US Highway 64 in Cashiers, Jackson County, North Carolina. It was built in 1896-1898, and consisted of a 2 1/2-story main block with two rear wings. The Queen Anne style frame building featured three massive singled gables, hipped dormers, a three-story corner turret, elliptical windows, and a one-story lakeside verandah.  The hotel had 100 rooms.

In July, 1982, it was added to the National Register of Historic Places.

Current use
The building was originally built in 1896 near a former gold mine on Lake Fairfield and added to in the early 1900s.  It stood on Lake Fairfield near US 64 until 1986.  Never renovated, a fire in 1986 exposed the fact the hotel was unsafe and it was demolished later that year.

See also
National Register of Historic Places listings in Jackson County, North Carolina

References

Hotel buildings on the National Register of Historic Places in North Carolina
Queen Anne architecture in North Carolina
Hotel buildings completed in 1898
Buildings and structures in Jackson County, North Carolina
National Register of Historic Places in Jackson County, North Carolina
1898 establishments in North Carolina
Buildings and structures demolished in 1986
1986 disestablishments in North Carolina
Demolished buildings and structures in North Carolina
Demolished hotels in the United States